Respiratory sounds, also known as lung sounds or breath sounds, refer to the specific sounds generated by the movement of air through the respiratory system. These may be easily audible or identified through auscultation of the respiratory system through the lung fields with a stethoscope as well as from the spectral characteristics of lung sounds. These include normal breath sounds and adventitious or "added" sounds such as crackles, wheezes, pleural friction rubs, stertor, and stridor.

Description and classification of the sounds usually involve auscultation of the inspiratory and expiratory phases of the breath cycle, noting both the pitch (typically described as low (≤200 Hz), medium or high (≥400 Hz))  and intensity (soft, medium, loud or very loud) of the sounds heard.

Normal breath sounds 
Normal breath sounds are classified as vesicular, bronchovesicular, bronchial or tracheal based on the anatomical location of auscultation. Normal breath sounds can also be identified by patterns of sound duration and the quality of the sound as described in the table below:

Abnormal breath sounds
Common types of abnormal breath sounds include the following:

Continued
Rales: Small clicking, bubbling, or rattling sounds in the lungs. They are heard when a person breathes inhales. They are believed to occur when air opens alveoli. Rales can also be described as moist, dry, fine, and coarse.
Rhonchi are coarse rattling respiratory sounds, usually caused by secretions in bronchial airways. The sounds resemble snoring. "Rhonchi" is the plural form of the singular word "rhonchus".
Stridor: Wheeze-like sound heard when a person breathes. Usually it is due to a blockage of airflow in the windpipe (trachea) or in the back of the throat.
Wheezing: High-pitched sounds produced by narrowed airways. They are most often heard when a person breathes out (exhales). Wheezing and other abnormal sounds can sometimes be heard without a stethoscope.

Other tests of auscultation
Pectoriloquy, egophony and bronchophony are tests of auscultation that utilize the phenomenon of vocal resonance. Clinicians can utilize these tests during a physical exam to screen for pathological lung disease. For example, in whispered pectoriloquy, the person being examined whispers a two syllable number as the clinician listens over the lung fields. The whisper is not normally heard over the lungs, but if heard may be indicative of pulmonary consolidation in that area. This is because sound travels differently through denser (fluid or solid) media than the air that should normally be predominant in lung tissue. In egophony, the person being examined continually speaks the English long-sound "E" (/i/). The lungs are usually air filled, but if there is an abnormal solid component due to infection, fluid, or tumor, the higher frequencies of the "E" sound will be diminished. This changes the sound produced, from a long "E" sound to a long "A" sound (/eɪ/).

History
In 1957, Robertson and Coope proposed the two main categories of adventitious (added) lung sounds. Those categories were "Continuous" and "Interrupted" (or non-continuous). In 1976, the International Lung Sound Association simplified the sub-categories as follows:
Continuous
Wheezes (>400 Hz)
Rhonchi (<200 Hz) 
Discontinuous
Fine crackles
Coarse crackles

Several sources will also refer to "medium" crackles, as a crackling sound that seems to fall between the coarse and fine crackles. Crackles are defined as discrete sounds that last less than 250 ms, while the continuous sounds (rhonchi and wheezes) last approximately 250 ms. Rhonchi are usually caused by a stricture or blockage in the upper airway. These are different from stridor.

See also
Imaging Lung Sound Behavior with Vibration Response Imaging

References

External links 

Audio Breath Sounds  - Multiple case studies with audio files of lung sounds.
 R.A.L.E. Repository - sound files of breath sounds
 MEDiscuss - Respiratory auscultation with audio examples
 
 Lehrer, Steven. Understanding Lung Sounds. Elsevier 2002.
 Lung Sounds - 20 recordings and waveforms

Symptoms and signs: Respiratory system
Pulmonology